James E. Whitlock (known as Jimmie Whitlock; born 1934), is a former Democratic member of the Kentucky House of Representatives from Lebanon, the seat of Marion County, Kentucky.

Whitlock was elected to three two-year terms in District 29 in 1961, 1963, and 1965. He did not seek a fourth term in the general election held on November 7, 1967. He was instrumental in developing Community Trust Bank and was CEO for three decades.

References

1934 births
Living people
Democratic Party members of the Kentucky House of Representatives
People from Lebanon, Kentucky
People from Campbellsville, Kentucky
People from North Palm Beach, Florida